Falmer railway station is in East Sussex, south-east England,  from  on the East Coastway line. It is operated by Southern.

The station serves the village of Falmer as well as the University of Sussex campus and the University of Brighton Falmer campus. It also serves Falmer Stadium, the home of Brighton & Hove Albion F.C. as well as various eastern suburbs of Brighton such as Woodingdean and Rottingdean. 

The original station was approximately 53 chains east of its present location, and opened on 8 June 1846.  It was moved to its present location, much closer to the village, on 1 August 1865, and rebuilt in 1890.  The buildings on the down (eastbound) platform date from this time, but modern replacements have been installed on the westbound side.

1851 accident 
On 6 June 1851, a train derailed soon after departing for Lewes, resulting in the death of five people. 

After striking a sleeper which had been placed on the track by trespassers, most of the train crashed down into the road below. Although the immediate cause was the striking of the sleeper, the official inquiry determined that the train had been travelling too fast: that if it had been travelling within the recommended speed limit, it would not have derailed. The inquiry also determined that operating the train with the engine going backwards reduced the driver's visibility.

Service 

All services at Falmer are operated by Southern using  and  EMUs.

The typical off-peak service in trains per hour is:
 3 tph to 
 2 tph to 
 1 tph to  via 

From May 2023 there will be 2tph off-peak between Brighton and Eastbourne, with 1tph continuing to Ore

In addition, most usual services are run with additional carriages and the platforms at the station have been extended to accommodate the longer trains.

A queuing system is in operation in both directions after full-time at the stadium.

References

External links 

Railway stations in Brighton and Hove
Former London, Brighton and South Coast Railway stations
Railway stations in Great Britain opened in 1846
Railway stations in Great Britain closed in 1865
Railway stations in Great Britain opened in 1865
Railway stations served by Govia Thameslink Railway
1846 establishments in England
DfT Category E stations